Overseer may refer to:

Professions
Supervisor or superintendent; one who keeps watch over and directs the work of others
Plantation overseer, often in the context of forced labor or slavery
Overseer of the poor, an official who administered relief for poor people
Provveditore, gubernatorial title in the Republic of Venice
Website overseer
Overseer (rank), a rank in Arab armies.

Other uses
Aerojet SD-2 Overseer, an unmanned aerial vehicle (UAV) used by the US Army in the 1950s and 1960s
Many Holiness and Pentecostal denominations call senior church leaders "overseers" or "general overseers." This is a literal translation of the Greek word ἐπίσκοπος, which was borrowed into Latin as episcopus and ultimately became the English word Bishop.
CASM Overseer, a series of Chinese UAVs
Overseer, formerly The Overseer Project, a role-playing game based on the fictional game SBURB from the Homestuck universe.
Rob Overseer, British music producer
Overseer (probate), a person appointed by a testator to assist and supervise the work of the executors of a Will (mainly obsolete).